The Lynns are an American country music duo, consisting of twin sisters Peggy Lynn and Patsy Lynn (born August 6, 1964), who are the youngest daughters of Mooney Lynn and singer Loretta Lynn.

They recorded one album for Reprise Records, which charted two singles on Hot Country Songs. The Lynns have received CMA Award nominations for Vocal Duo of the Year in 1998 and 1999.

Their album was met with mixed reception. Peter Margasak of Chicago Reader wrote that "musically they don't show much more spunk. Their singing...is no match for their mother's, but they're certainly not alone there....most of the material is typical Nashville mush: weepy ballads and tame, predictable rockers." Jason Ankeny of AllMusic praised the duo's "powerful voices" but criticized the "formulaic production".

Discography

The Lynns

Track listing
"Crazy World of Love" (Patsy Lynn, Peggy Lynn, Philip Russell) - 2:36
"Woman to Woman" (Patsy Lynn, Peggy Lynn, Russell) -3:32
"This Must Be Love" (Kostas, James House) - 2:23
"It Hurts" (Patsy Lynn, Peggy Lynn) - 4:08
"Cry Cry Baby" (Patsy Lynn, Peggy Lynn, James Lewis) - 3:03
"Nights Like These" (Patsy Lynn, Peggy Lynn) - 3:10
"Oh My Goodness" (Patsy Lynn, Peggy Lynn, Mitch Callis) - 3:29
"What Am I Doing Loving You" (Jamie O'Hara) - 2:47
"I Won't Leave This World Unloved" (Patsy Lynn, Jaime Kyle, Pat Bunch) - 3:08
"Someday" (Peggy Lynn, Patsy Lynn, Lewis) - 3:05

Musicians
From The Lynns liner notes.

Dennis Burnside - piano, keyboards, Hammond B-3 organ
Mark Casstevens - acoustic guitar
Larry Franklin - fiddle
James House - acoustic guitar
 David Hungate - bass guitar, acoustic bass guitar
Lloyd Maines - steel guitar
Pat McGrath - electric guitar
Steve Nathan - piano, keyboards, Hammond B-3 organ
Tony Paoletta - steel guitar, lap steel guitar
Brent Rowan - electric guitar
Bob Warren - percussion
Biff Watson - acoustic guitar
Lonnie Wilson - drums, percussion

Technical
Mike Bradley - recording, mixing
Don Cook - producer
Dale Dodson - associate producer
Ken Love - mastering
Pat McMakin - recording
Kenny Royster - vocal arrangement
Hank Williams - mastering

Singles

Music videos

References

1964 births
Living people
Country music groups from Tennessee
Country music duos
Identical twin females
Twin musical duos
Reprise Records artists
American twins
American people of Irish descent
Musical groups established in 1997
Musical groups disestablished in 1999
Female musical duos